0202 is the fourth studio album by Australian alternative rock group the Rubens, released on 12 February 2021 by Ivy League Records.

The album was announced on 15 October 2020, alongside the release of the video for the album's third single, "Time of My Life". After releasing "Live in Life" in November 2019, the group were looking towards a release date of mid-2020 for the album, however, due to COVID-19 restrictions, progress and the postponed Live in Life Tour from March 2020, the album was delayed.

The title 0202 refers to a "forward-thinking album for a backward year". In a press statement, the band said "We're so bloody proud of this album and the way we created it, and we can't believe how lucky we are to have made it this far."

The album was supported by an Australian tour commencing in April 2021.

At the 2021 ARIA Music Awards, Konstantin Kersting was nominated for Producer of the Year and Engineer of the Year for work on this album. Eric J Dubowsky was also nominated for Engineer of the Year for work on this album.

At the AIR Awards of 2022, the album was nominated for Best Independent Pop Album or EP.

Critical reception

Josh Leeson from The Newcastle Herald said the group have "...taken significant steps towards pop and R'n'B... and the Rubens sound all the better for it"; concluding with "0202 might be named after the most horrible year in recent memory for most people, but the Rubens have delivered an upbeat slice of pop sweetness."

Zoë Radas from Stack Magazine said the Rubens are "emerging with a classy collection of tunes that document a topsy-turvy year. Self-produced, the songs have a distinct pop sheen, though the cruisy vibe often belies a darker edge."

Triple J said "The Rubens have come out of 2020—the backward year—with a body of work which sees the band continue to push and expand themselves creatively and sonically. Self-producing their own work for the very first time, The Rubens bring to life their infectious energy in a 12-track alt-pop, RnB, pop and hip hop infused record."

Track listing

Personnel
The Rubens
 Sam Margin – vocals, guitar 
 Scott Baldwin – drums 
 Elliott Margin – keyboards, vocals 
 Izaac Margin – lead guitar 
 William Zeglis – bass guitar

Charts

Weekly charts

Year-end charts

References

2021 albums
The Rubens albums
Ivy League Records albums
Albums postponed due to the COVID-19 pandemic